Robert Earl Jones  (February 20, 1940 – May 14, 2021) was an American college basketball coach who was a men's head coach at Kentucky Wesleyan College. He played basketball at Georgetown College in Kentucky. He worked two years as assistant coach at Georgetown College before becoming assistant-coach with the Kentucky Wesleyan Panthers in 1967. In 1972, he was promoted to head coach, after the resignation of Bob Daniels. Jones was also named the school's athletic director, succeeding William Douglas, who had resigned earlier in the year.

Jones was fired as head coach in December 1979, but agreed to finish the season. On February 25, 1980, he coached his last game at Kentucky Wesleyan. He was hampered in his career by ailment and accusations of unenthusiastic recruiting. Jones resigned as athletic director in July.

Jones brought The Panthers to the 1973 NCAA Men's Division II Basketball Championship.

Jones died in Cincinnati on May 14, 2021, at age 81.

Head coaching record

References

1940 births
2021 deaths
American men's basketball coaches
American men's basketball players
Basketball coaches from Kentucky
Basketball players from Kentucky
College men's basketball head coaches in the United States
Georgetown Tigers men's basketball coaches
Georgetown Tigers men's basketball players
High school basketball coaches in the United States
Kentucky Wesleyan Panthers athletic directors
Kentucky Wesleyan Panthers men's basketball coaches
People from Bellevue, Kentucky